Mirko Šarić (6 June 1978 – 4 April 2000) was an Argentine footballer who played as a midfielder.

Club career
Šarić was born in Buenos Aires to Croatian parents. He joined the academy of San Lorenzo at a young age, and quickly progressed to make his first team debut in December 1996. He was seen as one of Argentina's top youth prospects, and had been linked to Spanish giants Real Madrid before his death. After a promising start to his career, a decline in form after being played out of position led to him appearing more as a substitute. In December 1999, while playing in a reserve game against River Plate, Šarić suffered ruptured ligaments in his left knee, which kept him sidelined until his death in 2000.

Personal life
Šarić had been dating a local woman for almost a year, and during this time she had fallen pregnant. Both Šarić and his mother had suspicions that he was not the father, backed up by the fact that Šarić had been on youth international duty with Argentina in Japan at the apparent date of conception. At his mother's advice, Šarić paid for a DNA test for himself and the baby, which came back negative.

Šarić suffered with depression, which contributed to his death. He had expressed this to San Lorenzo manager Oscar Ruggeri, and was receiving psychiatric help.

His brother, Martin, was also a professional footballer until his retirement in 2011. He currently works as a coach for San Lorenzo.

Death
On the morning of 4 April 2000, Šarić's mother found him dead in his room. He had committed suicide by hanging.

References

1978 births
2000 deaths
Argentine footballers
Argentina youth international footballers
Argentine people of Croatian descent
Association football midfielders
San Lorenzo de Almagro footballers
Argentine Primera División players
2000 suicides
Suicides by hanging in Argentina
Footballers from Buenos Aires